The Union Parliament was the bicameral legislature of the Union of Burma from 1948 to 1962, when it was disbanded by the Union Revolutionary Council. It consisted of an upper house, the Chamber of Nationalities and a lower house, the Chamber of Deputies.

From 1957 to 1963, the Union Parliament was a member of the Inter-Parliamentary Union (IPU).

References

Legislatures of Myanmar
1947 establishments in Burma
1962 disestablishments in Burma
Defunct bicameral legislatures